Theodora Roosevelt Clarke (born 4 August 1985) is a British Conservative Party  politician who has been the Member of Parliament (MP) for Stafford since the 2019 general election. Prior to her political career, she worked in the arts industry and founded the campaign group Coalition for Global Prosperity.

Early life and career
Clarke grew up in the village of Bibury in Gloucestershire. She is the daughter of Sir Charles Mansfield Tobias Clarke, 6th Baronet and his second wife Teresa de Chair, a daughter of Somerset de Chair. Her younger brother is former athlete Sir Lawrence Clarke, 7th Baronet. Clarke also has a younger sister, Augusta. She is the niece of the wife of the former Business Secretary, Jacob Rees-Mogg. Clarke is a distant relative of US Presidents Theodore Roosevelt and Franklin D. Roosevelt.

She was privately educated at Downe House School in Newbury, Berkshire. She studied art history at Newcastle University and the Courtauld Institute of Art, specialising in Russian Art. Clarke worked for the Museum of Modern Art in New York, and the British auction house Christie's before founding Russian Art and Culture, an online arts magazine in 2011. She was also a co-founder of the Association of Women in the Arts, and later founded the Coalition for Global Prosperity. As part of her work at the campaign group she volunteered in Sierra Leone in the aftermath of the Ebola outbreak.

In February 2023, Channel 4's Dispatches reported Clarke went on an all expenses paid trip to Russia in 2012 as part of the Conservatives Friends of Russia group, organised by the Russian government of Vladimir Putin.

Parliamentary career
Clarke contested the Bristol East seat at the 2015 and 2017 general elections as the Conservative Party candidate but was unsuccessful. The party selected her as the candidate for Stafford on 26 September 2019. The incumbent Conservative MP Jeremy Lefroy had previously announced that he would be standing down at the next election. She was elected as Stafford's MP in the 2019 general election with a majority of 14,377 (28.1%), the largest in the constituency's history.

Clarke has been a member of the International Development Committee since March 2020 and the Women and Equalities Committee since September 2020.

On 5 October 2020, Clarke was appointed as the Prime Ministerial Trade Envoy to Kenya. She helped implement the UK-Kenya Economic Partnership Agreement which continued the duty-free access to the UK market for Kenyan businesses after Brexit. The agreement carried forward arrangements agreed by the European Union and the East African Community. Clarke resigned this role in July 2022 in protest at Prime Minister Boris Johnson's leadership.

Clarke endorsed Penny Mordaunt during the July 2022 Conservative Party leadership election.

Clarke is taking six months maternity leave following the birth of her first child in August 2022. 

In February 2023, Clarke stated she was unable to be re-selected as Conservative candidate for Stafford, further stating she intended to appeal to local members in an attempt to stay on as candidate.

Personal life 
Clarke married Henry Coram-James, son of John Coram James and The Countess of Harrowby (formerly Caroline Coram James) and stepson of the Earl of Harrowby, on 14 August 2021 at the Church of St Mary, Bibury. In March 2022, she announced that the couple were expecting their first child. Their daughter was born in August 2022.

References

External links

Living people
UK MPs 2019–present
Conservative Party (UK) MPs for English constituencies
Female members of the Parliament of the United Kingdom for English constituencies
Daughters of baronets
21st-century British women politicians
Members of the Parliament of the United Kingdom for Stafford
1985 births
21st-century English women
21st-century English people